Sir Stephen Shepherd Allen  (2 August 1882 – 4 November 1964) was a New Zealand lawyer, farmer, colonial administrator, local-body politician, and mayor of Morrinsville.

Allen was the son of William Shepherd Allen, an MP in both the United Kingdom and New Zealand. His mother was Elizabeth Penelope Candlish, daughter of John Candlish. His brother William Allen was an MP in England. 

He served in World War I, being appointed a Companion of the Order of St Michael and St George in the 1919 King's Birthday Honours, and in the Territorial Army, and was Administrator of the colony of Western Samoa (now Samoa) from 1928 to 1931. His rule of Samoa was marked by the attempted suppression of the Mau movement – culminating on 29 December 1929 with the "Black Saturday" killing of eleven non-violent protesters, including  the Mau leader, Tupua Tamasese Lealofi III.

Allen was appointed a Knight Commander of the Order of the British Empire (KBE) in the 1933 King's Birthday Honours. In 1935, he was awarded the King George V Silver Jubilee Medal.

On 4 November 1964, Allen suffered a heart attack while driving near Maramarua, and both he and his housekeeper, Elma Jessie Brunton, died in the resulting crash.

References

New Zealand Army officers
New Zealand farmers
New Zealand military personnel of World War I
1882 births
1964 deaths
Mayors of places in Waikato
Administrators of the Western Samoa Trust Territory
1920s in Western Samoa Trust Territory
1930s in Western Samoa Trust Territory
New Zealand Companions of the Distinguished Service Order
New Zealand Companions of the Order of St Michael and St George
New Zealand Knights Commander of the Order of the British Empire
Reform Party (New Zealand) politicians
Unsuccessful candidates in the 1922 New Zealand general election
Road incident deaths in New Zealand
People from Morrinsville
20th-century New Zealand military personnel
20th-century New Zealand politicians
20th-century New Zealand  lawyers